Medinaceli is a municipality and town in the province of Soria, in Castile and León, Spain. The municipality includes other villages like Torralba del Moral.

Etymology 
Its name derives from the Arabic  , which was named after the Masmuda Berber family of the Banū Salīm.

History
Situated at the confluence of the rivers Jalón and Arbujuelo, Medinaceli was the site of the Celtiberian town known as Occilis or Okilis. From the Roman era until 1994, its saltworks were exploited for commercial use. During the Middle Ages, the town lay on the border between the lands of the Christians and those of the Moors.

Main sights
The Toro Jubilo annually occurs in Medinaceli, in which crowds of participants taunt a bull with balls of burning tar or turpentine (called "pitch") attached to its horns.

Medinaceli is home to the only three-gated Roman arch in Spain, built in the 1st-3rd centuries AD. The arch is used as Spain Historic site symbol throughout the country. 

The castle of Medinaceli served as the residence of the Dukes of Medinaceli until the Ducal Palace (Palacio Ducal) was used for this purpose.

Other buildings include the Colegiata de Nuestra Señora de la Asunción, whose abbots fought with the bishops of Sigüenza to maintain the city's rights. The Convent of Saint Elizabeth (16th century) (Convento de Santa Isabel), which lies next to the church of San Martín, also stands in good condition. The beaterio (house inhabited by lay sisters) of San Román (Saint Romanus) is in ruins; it may have previously been a synagogue.

Moorish-era remains include a stone gate, one of the few remains of the ancient city walls.

The town is also listed as a Camping Aire, suitable for motorhomes, in Vicarious Media "All the Aires in Spain". The aire is on a plateau next to a small water tower and affords magnificent panoramic views. The town is a very short walk from the aire.

"Fire Bull" festival

The "Toro Jubilo" or "Toro de Fuego" is a festival that takes place in Medinaceli. The festival is a symbolic ritual celebrating a victory against the Carthaginians in the city of Elche. During this festival, a bull is tied to a post. Balls of tar are then placed on each horn of the bull and lit. A thick layer of mud on the back and face of the bull helps protect the bull from physical injury or burns. The bull is then released in the square, which has five lit bonfires symbolizing five martyrs.

Animal rights group PACMA has described the fiesta as "a clear example of animal mistreatment"  and PETA has called it "a sadistic festival". They claim that the fire balls burn for hours, causing a great amount of stress on the animal.

References